Montemarano is a town and comune, former Latin bishopric and present titular see in the province of Avellino in the Campania region of southern Italy.

History 
The existence of the town is documented since the 11th century. During the Norman rule of southern Italy, it was   completely destroyed. Later it became a fiefdom of Raona of Fragneto. Other important feudal families were the Caracciolo, the Della Leonessa and the Della Marra. There is further evidence that it was a useful stopover by the Roman legions on their way to Brindisi, Terminus Appia A temple to the main Roman God, Jove was revealed decades ago dating to a style of building related to the Greeks. Hence, it is postulated that people inhabited Montemarano since BCE. A fire destroyed much of the documented evidence concerning the entire region,

Culture
The most important event is the  Montemarano Carnival with its  tarantella montemaranese, an ancient tradition of the place.

Economy 
The economy depends on agriculture, mostly on vineyards.

See also 
 Mezzogiorno

References

External links 
 GigaCatholic with incumbent biography links
 Montemarano
 Montemarano, Province of Avellino

Cities and towns in Campania